Sir John Trevor (1596–1673) was a Puritan Welsh landowner and politician who sat in the House of Commons at various times between 1621 and 1659. He supported the Parliamentarian cause in the English Civil War and was a member of the Council of State during the Commonwealth.

Early life
Trevor, whose father Sir John Trevor was Surveyor of the Queen's Ships under Elizabeth I, was knighted in 1619. In 1621 he was elected Member of Parliament for Denbighshire. He was elected MP for Flintshire in the Parliaments of 1624 and 1625. In 1628 he was elected MP for Great Bedwyn and sat until 1629 when King Charles decided to rule without parliament for eleven years. During the Personal Rule of Charles I, he was a member of several Royal Commissions, and amassed a substantial income: he had inherited from his father a share in the duties levied on coal from Newcastle, said to bring in £1,500 a year, and held the keepership of several Royal forests, all lucrative sinecures. (At one period he was Surveyor of Windsor Great Park.) He inherited Trevalyn Hall on the death of his uncle Richard Trevor in 1638.

Civil war and Commonwealth
In November 1640 Trevor was elected MP for Grampound in the Long Parliament, having connections with Cornwall through his mother, a Trevanion. He took the parliamentary side during the Civil War, and he was sufficiently supportive of the trial of the King to survive Pride's Purge and sit in the Rump. He seems to have been accepted as the spokesman for North Wales in many of the administrative committees that took over the country after the overthrow of the Monarchy, being twice elected to the Council of State, and also serving on the Committee of Both Kingdoms from 1648. However, he was not a member of the smaller council established after Cromwell assumed the Protectorate in 1653. In 1656 Trevor was elected MP for Arundel in the Second Protectorate Parliament, and was one of those advocating the offer of the Crown to Cromwell (to whom he was related by his son's marriage to John Hampden's daughter, Ruth). He was elected MP for Steyning in 1659 for the Third Protectorate Parliament.

Restoration
Although he resumed his seat at Grampound in 1659 in the restored Rump after Richard Cromwell's fall, he was an early supporter of the Restoration of Charles II, which ensured that he suffered no penalties for his earlier political loyalties after the King returned, being granted a royal pardon on 24 July 1660. However, he had invested much of his fortune during the Commonwealth in buying up lands confiscated from convicted Royalists, and suffered considerable loss as a result.

Family
Trevor's son, also called Sir John Trevor (1626–1672), was an MP with his father during the Commonwealth, and after the Restoration rose to become Secretary of State in 1668.

References

 Concise Dictionary of National Biography (1930)
D Brunton & D H Pennington, Members of the Long Parliament (London: George Allen & Unwin, 1954)
Cobbett's Parliamentary history of England, from the Norman Conquest in 1066 to the year 1803 (London: Thomas Hansard, 1808) 
 Flintshire Record Office
 John Trevor on National Library of Wales Dictionary of Welsh Biography

 
 

 
 

1596 births
1673 deaths
Members of the Parliament of England (pre-1707) for constituencies in Wales
Welsh Puritans
Roundheads
17th-century Welsh politicians
Members of the pre-1707 English Parliament for constituencies in Cornwall
English MPs 1621–1622
English MPs 1624–1625
English MPs 1625
English MPs 1628–1629
English MPs 1640–1648
English MPs 1656–1658
Alumni of Queens' College, Cambridge